Hall County Courthouse is a historic building in Grand Island, Nebraska, and the courthouse for Hall County, Nebraska. When it was built in 1901–1904, it replaced a former courthouse at another location. It was designed in the Beaux Arts style by architect Thomas Rogers Kimball. It has been listed on the National Register of Historic Places since September 15, 1977.

References

National Register of Historic Places in Hall County, Nebraska
Beaux-Arts architecture in Nebraska
Government buildings completed in 1904